Michael Arattukulam (17 April 1910 – 20 March 1995) was the first bishop of the Roman Catholic Diocese of Alleppey and an advocate of the Rotae Romanae.

Career 
The Roman Catholic Diocese of Alleppey belongs to the Latin rite and was created on 19 June 1952 by the division of the Roman Catholic Diocese of Cochin. Arattukulam was consecrated as the Bishop of Alleppey on 7 December 1952. Arattukulam participated in the four sessions in the Second Ecumenical Council of Vatican held at St. Peter's Basilica, Rome, from 1962–1965. He was the first bishop to publicly criticize the "Indianization" of the Catholic Church's liturgy, although some Catholic groups protested against the use of Hindu elements in the Mass. Arattukulam identified the sanctity of Fernanda Riva's life and asked that her Cause for Canonisation be introduced. Arattukulam founded colleges, schools, hospitals, and other social service organizations and published two books on Catholic topics.

Foundations

 St. Michael's College, Cherthala
 Alleppey Diocesan Social Welfare Society
 St. Joseph's College for Women Alappuzha
 Credit Union
 Catholic Teacher's Guild of Diocese of Alleppey
 Corporate Management of Schools (Diocese of Alleppey)
 Suvishesha Bhavan

Works

 Latin Catholics of Kerala 
 A study of the Inter Rites and Inter-Rite Conflicts in the Varapoly Seminary
'' St. Francis Xavier on the Malabar Coast (1968)
Translation to English : `Noticias do Reino do Malabar' [Information concerning the Kingdom of Malabar] (in Portuguese), By Joseph Kariattil

References

External links
 Bishop Michael Arattukulam [Catholic-Hierarchy] 
 Alleppey (Diocese) [Catholic-Hierarchy] 
 List of Catholic Dioceses in Asia |Catholic Directory | UCA News
 Welcome to KRLCC
 Wayback Machine
 St. Michael's College

1910 births
1995 deaths
20th-century Indian non-fiction writers
20th-century Roman Catholic bishops in India
People from Alappuzha district
Indian religious writers
Scholars from Kerala
Christian clergy from Kerala